The 1869 Tipperary by-election was fought on 27 November 1869.  The by-election was fought due to the death of the incumbent MP of the Liberal Party, Charles Moore.  It was won by the Independent Nationalist candidate Jeremiah O'Donovan Rossa.

References

1869 elections in the United Kingdom
By-elections to the Parliament of the United Kingdom in County Tipperary constituencies
November 1869 events
1869 elections in Ireland